José Viyuela Castillo (born 2 June 1963), known as Pepe Viyuela, is a Spanish actor, clown, poet, and comedian. He is best known in English-speaking countries for his one-man stage show Encerrona (Lock-In), which was brought to the London stage in June 2017 as part of the Festival of Spanish Theatre in London (Festelón).

He is known for playing Filemón in La gran aventura de Mortadelo y Filemón (2003) and Mortadelo y Filemón. Misión: salvar la Tierra (2008). In 2003 he published the novel Bestiario del circo: el vientre de la carpa, with a prologue by Andrés Aberasturi. In 2008 he published his second collection of poems named Las letras de tu nombre.

Selected filmography

Film

Television

Theatre

References

External links
 

1963 births
Living people
People from Logroño
21st-century Spanish male actors
Spanish clowns
Spanish comedians
Spanish male television actors
Spanish poets
Spanish male poets
Spanish stand-up comedians